Larry Rudolph Brunson (born August 11, 1949) is a former American football wide receiver in the National Football League. He played for the Kansas City Chiefs, the Oakland Raiders and the Denver Broncos between 1974 and 1980. He is the father of former minor league baseball player Matt Brunson.

He attended Cortez High School in Cortez, Colorado and then Mesa State College in Grand Junction, Colorado and the University of Colorado at Boulder.

He was 5'11" and he weighed 180 pounds. He was drafted in the 11th round of the 1972 draft by the Denver Broncos.

He finished his NFL career with 104 receptions and 1787 yards, for an average of 17.2 yards a catch. He scored a total of six touchdowns and his career long reception was 84 yards, which he accomplished in his rookie season. He fumbled the ball seven times in his career.

He rushed the ball 12 times in his career for 104 yards. He averaged 5.2 yards a rush.

External links
NFL.com player page

1949 births
Living people
American football wide receivers
Colorado Buffaloes football players
Colorado Mesa Mavericks football players
Kansas City Chiefs players
Oakland Raiders players
Denver Broncos players
Sportspeople from Little Rock, Arkansas